The Campaign of Herat consisted of a series of intermittent and fluid engagements culminating in the finale of Nader's military operations against the Abdali Pashtuns. Nader having recently concluded a successful campaign against his own monarch and prince, the badly humiliated Tahmasp II, set out from Mashad on 4 May 1729, making sure that the Shah also accompanied him on this journey where he could be kept under close supervision.

The conflict is also important because it helped develop Nader's tactics against light cavalry armies, something that would be important at the Battle of Damghan (1729), where the Hotaki Pashtuns were given a rude introduction to modern warfare by Nader's well-drilled army.

Background of the Campaign 
The Abdali forces consisted of 15,000 riders under Allahyar Khan, the governor of Herat, concentrated around Kafer Qal'eh and another detachment of 12,000 men led by an impetuous commander by the name of Zulfaqar Khan which was approaching kafer Qal'eh from the south. In the ensuing ebb and flow of marches and counter marches where dozens of skirmishes, charges, feints, ruses and retreats Nader would find himself hard-pressed to keep the upper hand in a constantly changing battlefield environment where even the weather would prove unpredictable.

The Road to Herat 
The battle of Kafer Qal'eh resulted in a tactical victory for Nader after which Allahyar Khan was pursued and re-engaged. At the height of the battle Nader's scouts brought word of Zulfaqar Khans approach prompting Nader to carry out an ingenious ruse. A column of Persian troops was sent on a march round Allahyar Khan's army with their victory drums & horns sounding loudly which led him to believe that Zulfaqar Khan's men had already been defeated forcing him to beat another hasty retreat.
 
As Allahyar broke away towards Herat Nader dispatched a portion of his army to pursue him but kept the bulk of his men to turn and face the fresh troops under Zulfaqar khan's command, however before Nader engaged Zulfaqar's contingent a sandstorm swept into the area rendering any further fighting all but impossible, thereby providing a cover under which the Abdali forces managed to withdraw towards Herat unmolested.

The entire campaign thus far had been a chain of skirmishes, marches and counter marches where Nader excelled as a quick thinking commander who outwitted his foes at every corner despite at times seemingly caught in near impossible situations such as when news of Zulfaqar's imminent arrival reached him when he was already heavily engaged with Allahyar Khan's men. The impressive campaign however did not result in the Abdali's destruction and Nader followed their retreat eastward until he came in view of Herat where the combined forces of Allahyar & Zulfaqar rode out to meet him in a finale to the campaign.

Subjugation of Herat 
When battle was joined for the final time in view of Herat itself the action was uncannily similar to the previous engagements between the Persians and the Abdalis except that on this particular occasion the frontal charge of the Abdalis was firmly halted by muskets of the Persian line infantry crashing out simultaneously breaking the impetus of the Pashtun charge and providing adequate persuasion to the Abdalis to fall behind the city walls. Herat now came under an intense bombardment from the Persian guns and mortars, convincing the governor of Herat, Allahyar Khan, to sue for peace in exchange for recognition of Persia as suzerain of Herat.

See also
 Military of the Afsharid dynasty of Persia
 Battle of Kafer Qal'eh
 Nader Shah

References 

Conflicts in 1729
1729 in the Ottoman Empire
Battles involving the Ottoman Empire
Battles involving Safavid Iran
Campaigns of Nader Shah